Edgar Krahn ( – 6 March 1961) was an Estonian mathematician. Krahn was born in Sootaga (now Laiuse, Jõgeva County), Governorate of Livonia, as a member of the Baltic German minority. He died in Rockville, Maryland, United States.

Krahn studied at the University of Tartu and the University of Göttingen. He graduated at Tartu in 1918, received his doctoral degree at Göttingen in 1926, with Richard Courant as his advisor, and his habilitation took place at Tartu in 1928. He is co-author of the Rayleigh–Faber–Krahn inequality.

Krahn worked in Estonia, Germany, the United Kingdom, and the United States in the following areas of pure and applied mathematics:

 Differential geometry
 Differential equations
 Bausparmathematik, which is distantly related to insurance mathematics
 Probability theory
 Gas dynamics
 Elasticity theory

See also
List of Baltic German scientists

References

1894 births
1961 deaths
People from Jõgeva Parish
People from the Governorate of Livonia
Baltic-German people
Estonian mathematicians
20th-century mathematicians
20th-century Estonian scientists
University of Tartu alumni
University of Göttingen alumni